Long Pond is a lake in Herring Cove, Halifax, Nova Scotia, Canada. It is used both for swimming in the summer and skating in the winter.

References

Lakes of Nova Scotia
Landforms of Halifax, Nova Scotia
Landforms of Halifax County, Nova Scotia